Anadenobolus is a genus of millipedes in the family Rhinocricidae. There are more than 100 described species in Anadenobolus.

See also
 List of Anadenobolus species

References

Further reading

 
 

Spirobolida
Millipedes of North America